The Silver Line is a proposed higher-speed rail line in India that would connect Thiruvananthapuram, the capital city, and Kasaragod of Kerala state. Thiruvananthapuram, Kollam, Chengannur, Kottayam, Ernakulam, Thrissur, Tirur, Kozhikode, Kannur and Kasaragod will be the stations in this corridor. The project is temporarily halted by the state government till the Central government approval. 

The Detailed Project Report of the project is being prepared by K-Rail (Kerala Rail Development Corporation Limited), a joint venture company between Ministry Of Railways and Government of Kerala.

The railway line aims to ease transport congestion between the northern and southern regions of the state, whilst also improving travel times and mitigate climate change. The project includes a roll-on/roll-off (RORO) train service that conveys road vehicles, and enhanced feeder public transport services from stations. In November 2022, the Kerala government recalled the revenue officials, who were deployed to conduct a social impact assessment study for land acquisition.

Background 
Kerala has  of roads which is 4.2% of India's total length. This is quite high considering that Kerala accounts for 2.7% of the total population of India. The existing railway network in the state is also not suitable for faster travel. The average speed of journey by rail and road in the state is about 30% to 40% lower than in the neighbouring states.

The journey becomes even slower in the rainy seasons because of deterioration in the condition of the roads and railway lines. Because of the adverse terrain, there is little scope of economically raising speed of trains on the existing railway line in the corridor. With the above in mind, the Government has decided to build the Thiruvananthapuram - Kasaragod corridor as a Semi high-speed line, covering the coastal region which is the most densely populated region of the state.

Kerala being a densely populated state, most of the commuters depend on the conventional modes of transport. The proposed  Silver Line (SHSR) will bring about a remarkable change in local commute, by improving the travel time and quality of transportation. There will be a substantial reduction in road accidents due to the reduction of congestion on roads. This also includes the last mile connectivity using aggregate services and feeder services, which will transform the people's perception towards public transportation. The Silver Line (previously called as SHSR) will also be duly integrated with the existing Indian Railway network for the benefit of interstate and long distance travellers.

Environmental and social impact 
The studies regarding the environmental impact is not completed yet . The requirement of m-sand ,rock ,wood  etc also needs to be considered .

Transport systems bring enormous benefits to society providing access and mobility that are essential for modern societies and economic growth. However, transport activities have many undesirable external impacts as well, such as CO2 emissions, congestion, accidents, land use and many more. The urge to fight these challenges is therefore pushing economies towards more efficient, and sustainable solutions.

Silver Line  is claimed to be a suitable alternative as it saves time, resources, and helps in reduction of carbon footprint by relying on renewable energy sources for its stations, providing last-mile connectivity to and from the station using electric vehicles (EVs), and facilities for parking/charging EVs at the stations. The proposed RORO services also contribute in reducing pollution and congestion compared to road transport of goods  vehicles.

History 

The Thiruvananthapuram–Mangalore high-speed rail corridor was mooted in the 2009-10 budget speech of the LDF government. The project was cleared by the State Cabinet in February 2010. The Kerala State Industrial Development Corporation (KSIDC) was appointed as the nodal agency to develop the project.

In September 2011, a special purpose vehicle, the Kerala High Speed Rail Corporation Ltd. (KHSRC) was formed to implement the project. The Ministry of Railways has stated that the project is feasible and has expressed full support for the project. The Delhi Metro Rail Corporation (DMRC) conducted the pre-feasibility study of the project. The KHSRC requested the DMRC to submit a detailed project report (DPR) for the project by November 2012. However, the DPR faced several delays.

In February 2014, the Indian media reported that the state government shelved the project. The Times of India quoted unnamed sources as stating, "It has not been scrapped officially, but it is at a dead stage. The estimated project cost has almost doubled now, and the more the delay, the costlier the project would become." The cost of constructing the project was estimated to be , much higher than the originally estimated . 80% of the cost was proposed to be funded by JICA, and the remaining 20% by the State and Central governments.

In March 2014, T. Balakrishnan, Chairman and Managing Director of KHSRCL, denied that the project had been scrapped. In October 2014, Kerala Chief Minister Shri Oommen Chandy stated that the government wished to implement the project, and that the project was stalled due to protests. He also stated that the survey had been completed and the project would be implemented only with the support of people.

In June 2016, the newly elected Left government asked the DMRC to complete the DPR. The DMRC submitted the detailed project report (DPR) to the state government in July 2016. The DMRC proposed constructing a  line from Kochuveli in Thiruvananthapuram up to Kannur, with an option to extend the line up to Mangalore in a later phase. The Union Government approved the DMRC's draft report on 9 July 2016.

In August 2016, the KHSRCL announced that it would conduct survey to determine public opinion of the proposed alignment. The survey is intended to prevent any possible protests over land acquisition and suppress dissent from opponents of development projects in the state. The results of the survey, published in February 2017, found that 86% of the 13,447 people interviewed across 110 assembly constituencies in 11 districts were in favour of the project. Only 9% of those surveyed opposed the project, while 5% remained neutral. 73% of the respondents were aware of the project before being interviewed. Of those who had not heard of the project, 82% expressed support, while 88% of those who were aware expressed support. Supporters of the project believe that it will reduce travel time, reduce greenhouse gas emissions and accidents, and generate development in the state. Opponents of the project argue that the project will result in large-scale displacement of people as a result of land acquisition, take away the livelihood of farmers whose land is acquired, waste a large sum of money, and reduce the number of trees.
 
In 2019, a survey by French consultant company Systra found that the Kochuveli-Kasaragod rail corridor could be financially viable. 
Systra found that the project can recoup 6%  of its cost every year after linking Thiruvananthapuram and Kochi airports. The state agency, Kerala State Remote Sensing and Environment Centre (KSERC), is supposed to submit the survey report by March 2020. After land acquisition order, a detailed project report (DPR) will be prepared by the Government of Kerala.

Project details 

In August 2021, the Revenue Department of Thiruvananthapuram published a list of survey numbers for land confiscation. Kerala Infrastructure Investment Fund Board approved a loan of Rs 2100 crores for buying these lands from respective owners of these plots.

Plan 
Kerala will get a special railway corridor along its  length by 2024, as the state government is set to build a  rail line that will enable semi-high speed trains ply between upstate Kasaragod and the capital city of Thiruvananthapuram. The semi-high-speed corridor from Thiruvananthapuram to Kasargode would not have any level crossings. They will initially have nine coaches, and the number will be subsequently enhanced to 12. The travel charge is projected to be ₹2.75 per km (2.4¢ US/mi), and there will be an annual hike of 7.5 per cent.

K-Rail expects a ridership of 67,740 passengers a day. It estimates to carry 1,330 travellers in one direction at peak hours. For meeting the expenses of the  project,  will come as loans. The Centre and state will need to provide  each. The Kerala government will spend  on land acquisition and allied matters. The rest of the expenses will be met through other loans by the union and state governments. The rail line will pass through 11 of the state's 14 districts, and will stop at ten stations. Up its northward course from Thiruvananthapuram, these stations will be Kollam, Chengannur, Kottayam, Kochi, Kochi Airport, Thrissur, Tirur, Kozhikode and Kannur before reaching Kasaragod.
The SilverLine corridor will be 100% green project. K-Rail is set to adopt last-mile connectivity, with multi-modal integration, system-driven e-vehicle public transport system, charging as well as parking stations, which would take the state to next generation of urban mobility. The project will also adopt the latest world-class rail system technology like signalling system of ERTMS level-2 with automatic train control system, ticketing, communication, fully air-conditioned rolling stock with modern passenger amenities.
The main depot for the line will be located near the Kochuveli terminus.

Protests
There are many protests against K Rail initiative due to access of private land without a proper compensation and assent. Several people were arrested for non-cooperation .

See also
 High-speed rail in India
 K-Rail (Kerala Rail Development Corporation)

References

 
 
 
 
 
 
 
 

High-speed railway lines in India
Proposed railway lines in India
Rail transport in Kerala
Transport in Thiruvananthapuram
Transport in Kannur
Standard gauge railways in India